The 2015 Conference USA (C-USA) softball tournament was held at Felsberg Field at FIU Softball Field in Miami, Florida, from May 7 through May 9, 2015. The tournament winner will earn the Conference USA automatic bid to the 2015 NCAA Division I softball tournament. All games will be televised. The quarterfinals and semifinals will be shown on the C-USA Digital Network while the championship will be broadcast on CBS Sports Network. Ben Holden and Tammy Blackburn will call the championship.

Tournament

All times listed are Eastern Daylight Time.

References

Conference USA Tournament
Tournament, 2015